William Charles Fischer (October 11, 1930 – October 30, 2018) was an American professional baseball pitcher who played in Major League Baseball from 1956 to 1964 for the Chicago White Sox, Detroit Tigers, Washington Senators / Minnesota Twins and Kansas City Athletics.  He later was a longtime pitching coach at the major and minor league levels. He stood 6' (183 cm) tall, weighed 190 pounds (86 kg) and threw and batted right-handed. He was born in Wausau, Wisconsin.

Pitching career
As a pitcher, Fischer won 45 games and lost 58 (.437), with a career earned run average of 4.34. He appeared in 281 games, starting 78, and compiled 16 complete games and 13 saves. In 831 career innings pitched, Fischer surrendered 936 hits and 210 bases on balls, with 313 strikeoutss.

Fischer made his debut on April 21, 1956, with the Chicago White Sox. In the middle of the 1958 campaign, he was traded along with Tito Francona to the Detroit Tigers for Ray Boone and Bob Shaw.

Fischer was later traded to the Kansas City Athletics with Ozzie Virgil for Gerry Staley and Reno Bertoia.

This didn't keep Fischer in Kansas City for long, however. After one more season with the A's, the Minnesota Twins drafted Fischer in the Rule 5 draft in 1963, and he concluded his big-league career with the club, spending a few months of the 1964 season on the inactive list as a Minnesota scout.  The White Sox signed Fischer as an active player and free agent following his stint with the Twins, but he never returned to the majors and was released in 1968.

Coaching career
He also served as a minor league pitching instructor in the Royals' organization. Although Fischer never was MLB pitching coach of the Kansas City club, he held that post with the Cincinnati Reds (1979–83), Boston Red Sox (1985–91) and Tampa Bay Devil Rays (2000–01). At Boston, he was a favorite of star right-hander Roger Clemens. After his firing by the Red Sox, he rejoined Schuerholz with the Atlanta Braves as the Braves' minor league pitching coordinator and pitching coach of Triple-A Richmond (1992–99; 2004–06).

He entered the  baseball season still active in the game.  He rejoined the Royals in 2007 as minor league pitching coordinator and special assistant for player development, and in 2018, as Kansas City's senior pitching advisor, he marked his 69th season in professional baseball. Fischer died on October 30, 2018, at the age of 88.

See also
List of Major League Baseball individual streaks

References

External links

1930 births
2018 deaths
Baseball coaches from Wisconsin
Baseball players from Wisconsin
Boston Red Sox coaches
Chicago White Sox players
Cincinnati Reds coaches
Colorado Springs Sky Sox (WL) players
Detroit Tigers players
Hawaii Islanders players
Hot Springs Bathers players
Indianapolis Indians players
Kansas City Athletics players
Kansas City Royals scouts
Major League Baseball pitchers
Major League Baseball pitching coaches
Memphis Chickasaws players
Minnesota Twins players
Minnesota Twins scouts
Navegantes del Magallanes players
American expatriate baseball players in Venezuela
Portland Beavers players
Sportspeople from Wausau, Wisconsin
Tampa Bay Devil Rays coaches
Toronto Maple Leafs (International League) players
Vancouver Mounties players
Washington Senators (1901–1960) players
Waterloo White Hawks players
Wisconsin Rapids White Sox players